Ghawar (Arabic: الغوار) is an oil field located in Al-Ahsa Governorate, Eastern Province, Saudi Arabia. Measuring  (some ), it is by far the largest conventional oil field in the world, and accounts for roughly a third of the cumulative oil production of Saudi Arabia as of 2018.

Ghawar is entirely owned and operated by Saudi Aramco, the state-run Saudi oil company. In April 2019, the company first published its profit figures since its nationalization nearly 40 years ago in the context of issuing a bond to international markets.

Geology 
Ghawar occupies an anticline above a basement fault block dating to Carboniferous time, about 320million years ago; Cretaceous tectonic activity, as the northeast margin of Africa began to impinge on southwest Asia, enhanced the structure. Source rock is the Jurassic Hanifa formation, a marine shelf deposit of mud and lime with as much as 5% organic material, it is estimated that 1% to 7% is considered good oil source rock. The seal is an evaporitic package of rocks including impermeable anhydrite.

History 
In the early 1940s, Max Steineke, Thomas Barger and Ernie Berg noted a bend in the Wadi Al-Sahbah dry riverbed. Measurements confirmed that the area had undergone geologic uplift, an indication that an oil reservoir may be trapped underneath. Oil was indeed found, in what turned out to be the southern reaches of Ghawar.

Historically, Ghawar has been subdivided into five production areas, from north to south: 'Ain Dar and Shedgum, 'Uthmaniyah, Hawiyah and Haradh. The major oasis of Al-Ahsa and the city of Al-Hofuf are located on Ghawar's east flank, corresponding to the 'Uthmaniyah production area. Ghawar was discovered in 1948 and put on stream in 1951. Some sources claim that Ghawar peaked in 2005, though this is denied by the field operators.

Saudi Aramco reported in mid-2008 that Ghawar had produced 48% of its proven reserves.

Extraction of crude oil 
Approximately 60–65% of all Saudi oil produced between 1948 and 2000, came from Ghawar. Cumulative extraction of petroleum through early 2010, has exceeded .

Water flooding is said to have begun in 1965. The water cut was about 32% in 2003, and ranged from about 27% to 38% from 1993 to 2003. By 2006, North Uthmaniyah's water cut was about 46%.

Energy Content and Comparison 

The largest solar farm in the world, Bhadla solar park in India, covering  and boasting a nameplate capacity of 2255 MW would produce  of electricity at a capacity factor of 100% (i.e. If the sun was shining at peak intensity at all times) but given a more realistic capacity factor of 25% it would only produce  of electricity per year. The largest wind farm as of 2021, Gansu Wind Farm in China has a nameplate capacity approaching 8 GW with plans to ramp up to 20 GW. A 20 gigawatt power plant at 100% capacity factor could deliver  of electric output per year. However, once again due to the weather-dependency and intermittency of wind power, capacity factors for onshore wind installations like Gansu are typically much lower, ranging at 15-35% depending on local factors. The Ghawar oil field is thus the largest single supplier of primary energy on planet earth.

Reserves 
In April 2010, Saad al-Tureiki, Vice-President for Operations at Aramco, stated, in a news conference reported in Saudi media, that over  have been produced from the field since 1951. Tureiki further stated that the total reserves of the field had originally exceeded .

The International Energy Agency in its 2008 World Energy Outlook stated that the oil production from Ghawar reached 66 Bbo in 2007, and that the remaining reserves are 74 Bbo.

Matthew Simmons, in his 2005 book Twilight in the Desert, suggested that production from the Ghawar field and Saudi Arabia may soon peak.

When appraised in the 1970s, the field was assessed to have  of original oil in place (OOIP), with about  recoverable (1975 Aramco estimate quoted by Matt Simmons). The second figure, at least, was understated since that production figure has already been exceeded.

See also 

Udhailiyah, residential compound built atop the central part of  Ghawar
 Khurais oil field
 List of oil fields
 Peak oil
 Swing producer

References

Further reading
  Still the basic public reference for Ghawar geology.

External links 
 Articles on Ghawar and analysis on its reserves from The Oil Drum
 Terrorists and Ghawar
  (source of most data in this article).
World-beater Ghawar a field apart , 2008 article in Saudi Aramco Dimensions magazine
Map of oil and gas infrastructure in Saudi Arabia

Eastern Province, Saudi Arabia
Oil fields of Saudi Arabia
Saudi Aramco oil and gas fields
Oil field disputes